There are two national and 10 state/territory daily newspapers, 35 regional dailies and 470 other regional and suburban newspapers in Australia. Each state and territory has one or two dominant daily newspapers which focus upon the major national news while also containing news of importance for the state that it is sold in. These include:The Sydney Morning Herald, The Daily Telegraph (Sydney), The Age (Melbourne), The Herald Sun (Melbourne) and The Canberra Times. The two national daily newspapers are The Australian and The Australian Financial Review, which are owned by different companies. Nearly all major metropolitan newspapers are owned either by News Limited, a subsidiary of News Corporation, or Nine Entertainment Co., with notable exceptions including The West Australian and The Sunday Times in Perth, and The Canberra Times in the nation's capital city.

Other notable newspapers and news websites are: news.com.au, ABC News Online, Seven News Online, SBS News Online, Nine News, the Guardian Australia, The New Daily and The Saturday Paper. Increasingly, news material is published online in Australia, sometimes exclusively.

History
, Adelaide, 3 June 1837]]

19th century
Australia's first newspaper was the Sydney Gazette and New South Wales Advertiser, that began in 1803. In 1810, the second newspaper in Australia, the Derwent Star and Van Diemen's Land Intelligencer was founded in Van Diemen's Land (Tasmania), but it was short-lived and ceased publication the same year. Victoria's first paper was the Melbourne Advertiser which began in 1838. By the mid-1850s, there were 11 papers in Tasmania. The Tasmanian and Port Dalrymple Advertiser founded in Launceston in 1825 was the first provincial newspaper in Australia.

Early newspapers tended to consist of four pages and generally appeared one or two days a week. They were hindered by occasional shortages of suitable paper, ink, compositors and printers. Publication sometimes had to be suspended due to such shortages.

Australia's longest-running newspaper, the Sydney Morning Herald, was first published as the Sydney Herald in 1831. The Heralds rival, The Daily Telegraph, was first published in July 1879. Weekly newspapers were an important feature of the Australian newspaper scene in the nineteenth century. Illustrated newspapers became increasingly important. They initially featured woodcut engravings and toward the end on the nineteenth century black and white photographs began to appear.

Australia's first foreign-language newspaper, Die Deutsche Post für die australischen Kolonien was published in Adelaide from 1848 to 1850.

Australia's first national daily newspaper, Daily Commercial News (now Lloyd's List Australia) was first published in April 1891. Only during the second part of the twentieth century did other national newspapers start to be published.

Newspapers played an important role in Australia in the nineteenth century. According to historian and former newspaper man Thomas McCombie in his, History of the Colony of Victoria (1858):

These sentiments were echoed by Richard Twopeny in, Town Life in Australia (1883):

This national obsession with newspapers continued into the 20th century so that historian Ken Inglis could note in 1962 that:

20th century
There were 26 metropolitan dailies in 1924, but this had fallen to just 14 by the 1960s due to closures and amalgamations. During the same period, the number of separate proprietors had gone from 21 to seven.

During the 1980s and 1990s colour printing and cold offset printing took place in the production of newspapers. Many newspapers became available in electronic form either on CD-ROM or via the World Wide Web.

21st century
The disruption of traditional print media by digital media that began late in the 20th century continued into the 21st century. In response, newspapers in Australia closed, amalgamated and/or laid off staff – by 2011, the top two newspaper owners accounted for 86% of newspaper sales in Australia. All major newspapers and most minor newspapers in Australia now produce a digital version of their publication. Many periodicals produce a digital version only. Further major changes to legacy media in Australia seem inevitable.

The COVID-19 pandemic impacted Australian news media by reducing advertising income. Some titles were closed permanently, while others were suspended for a time. In response, the Australian government provided financial support for regional media outlets.

See also
 Journalism in Australia
 List of newspapers in Australia
 List of newspapers in Australia by circulation
 List of people in communications and media in Australia
 Media of Australia

References

Further reading

 Collins, Ross F.; Palmegiano, E. M. Rise of Western Journalism, 1815–1914: Essays on the Press in Australia, Canada, France, Germany, Great Britain & the United States (2008)
 Cryle, Denis. "The Empire Press Union and Antipodean communications: Australian-New Zealand involvement 1909–1950." Media History (2002) 8#1 pp: 49–62.
 Cryle, Denis. "The press and public service broadcasting: Neville Petersen's news not views and the case for Australian exceptionalism." (2014) Media International Australia, Incorporating Culture & Policy Issue 151 (May 2014): 56+.
 Cryle, Denis. "The ebb and flow of the Tasman mediasphere: a century of Australian and New Zealand print media development, 1840–1940." (2005). online
 Cryle, D. Disreputable Profession: Journalists and Journalism in Colonial Australia (Central Queensland University Press: Rockhampton, Queensland, (1997)
 Dunstan, David, “Twists and turns: The origins and transformations of Melbourne’s metropolitan press in the nineteenth century,” Victorian Historical Journal, 89 (1) June 2018, 5-26
 Griffen-Foley, Bridget, "'Four More Points than Moses': Dr. HV Evatt, the Press and the 1944 Referendum." Labour History (1995): 63–79. in JSTOR

 Kirkpatrick, Rod. "The provincial press and politics: NSW, 1841–1930." Australian Studies in Journalism 8 (1999): 96-117.
 Manion, James. "History of newspapers in North Queensland." Journal of the Royal Historical Society of Queensland 11.4 (1981): 139–151. online
 Pearce, S. Shameless Scribblers: Australian Women's Journalism 1880–1995 (Central Queensland University Press: Rockhampton, Queensland, 1998)
 Read, Donald. "Reuters: News agency of the British empire." Contemporary British History 8.2 (1994): 195–212.
 Richardson, Nick. "From 'rags' to 'riches': The evolution of the Australian suburban newspaper." Media International Australia, Incorporating Culture & Policy 150 (2014): 83+.
 Van Heekeren, Margaret. "'Office boys' or intellectuals?: Sydney Morning Herald editors from 1903–1937." Australian Journalism Review 32#2 (2010): 75+.
 Vine, Josie. "'If I Must Die, Let Me Die Drinking at an Inn': The Tradition of Alcohol Consumption in Australian Journalism" Australia Journalism Monographs (2010) v 12 (Griffith Centre for Cultural Research, Griffith University)
 Walker, R. B. (1976), The newspaper press in New South Wales, 1803–1920, Sydney University Press. 
 Walker, Robin Berwick. Yesterday's news: history of the newspaper press in New South Wales from 1920 to 1945 (Intl Specialized Book Service Inc, 1980)

External links
National Library of Australia - "History of Australian Newspapers"
National Library of Australia - "Press timeline: Select chronology of significant Australian press events to 2011"
National Library of Australia - "Press timeline 1802 - 1850"

Newspapers published in Australia